The 2009 French Athletics Championships was the 121st edition of the national championship in outdoor track and field for France, organised by the French Athletics Federation. It was held on 23–25 July at the Stade du Lac de Maine in Angers. A total of 38 events (divided evenly between the sexes) were contested over the three-day competition. Hind Dehiba won a women's middle-distance double while Vanessa Gladone won both the horizontal jumps.

Results

Men

Women

References

Results
 Results. Fédération française d'athlétisme 

French Athletics Championships
French Athletics Championships
French Athletics Championships
French Athletics Championships
Sport in Angers